Whangaroa, also known as Whangaroa Village to distinguish it the larger area of the former Whangaroa County, is a settlement on Whangaroa Harbour in the Far North District of New Zealand. It is 8 km north-west of Kaeo and 35 km north-west of Kerikeri. The harbour is almost landlocked and is popular both as a fishing spot in its own right and as a base for deep-sea fishing.

History
The harbour was the scene of one of the most notorious incidents in early New Zealand history, the Boyd massacre. In December 1809 almost all the crew and 70 passengers were killed as utu (revenge) for the mistreatment of Te Ara, the son of a Ngāti Uru chief, who had been in the crew of the ship. Several days later the ship was burnt out after gunpowder was accidentally ignited. Relics of the Boyd are now in a local museum.

On 16 July 1824 on a voyage to Sydney from Tahiti, the crew and passengers of the colonial schooner Endeavour (Capt John Dibbs) stopped in Whangaroa Harbour. An altercation with the local Māori Ngāti Pou hapū (subtribe) of the Ngā Puhi iwi resulted in an incident where Maori warriors took control of the Endeavour and menaced the crew. The situation was defused by the timely arrival of the Ngāti Uru chief Te Ara, of Boyd fame. 

In February 1827, the famous Ngā Puhi chief Hongi Hika was engaged in warfare against the tribes of Whangaroa. Acting contrary to the orders of Hongi Hika, some of his warriors plundered and burnt Wesleydale, the Wesleyan mission that had been established in June 1823 at Kaeo, nine kilometres from Whangaroa. The missionaries, Rev Turner and his wife and three children, together with Rev. Messrs, Hobbs and Stack, and Mr Wade and wife, were 'compelled to flee from Whangarooa (sic) for their lives'. They were conveyed by ship to Sydney, NSW. During a skirmish Hongi Hika was shot in the chest by one of his warriors. On 6 March 1828 Hongi Hika died at Whangaroa. There is no actual evidence that Hongi himself plundered the mission; he was busily pursuing the enemy and being wounded. Nor is there any direct evidence to implicate anybody else  An alternate ideas was put forward by William Williams of the CMS. " It appears beyond doubt, though our Wesleyan Friends are loath to believe it, that it was their own chief, Tepui, was the instigator of the whole business". The local Ngatiuru had made the land available to the mission. For years the missionaries had lived amongst them and grown prosperous while the tribe still ate fern root. There was no prospect of the missionaries moving on and no prospect of them becoming acceptable neighbours. They had not joined the tribe. They had set up their own tribe which was steadily wearing down the authority of the Ngatiuru leadership. 

By the latter 19th century, the Whangaroa Harbour had become an important location for the kauri gum digging trade.

Demographics
Statistics New Zealand describes Whangaroa as a rural settlement. Whangaroa is part of the larger Whakarara statistical area.

Whangaroa had a population of 144 at the 2018 New Zealand census, an increase of 42 people (41.2%) since the 2013 census, and an increase of 39 people (37.1%) since the 2006 census. There were 72 households, comprising 78 males and 66 females, giving a sex ratio of 1.18 males per female. The median age was 62.5 years (compared with 37.4 years nationally), with 12 people (8.3%) aged under 15 years, 3 (2.1%) aged 15 to 29, 69 (47.9%) aged 30 to 64, and 54 (37.5%) aged 65 or older.

Ethnicities were 87.5% European/Pākehā, 14.6% Māori, 2.1% Pacific peoples, 2.1% Asian, and 2.1% other ethnicities. People may identify with more than one ethnicity.

Of those people who chose to answer the census's question about religious affiliation, 50.0% had no religion, 35.4% were Christian, 2.1% were Hindu and 2.1% had Māori religious beliefs.

Of those at least 15 years old, 24 (18.2%) people had a bachelor's or higher degree, and 21 (15.9%) people had no formal qualifications. The median income was $24,700, compared with $31,800 nationally. 21 people (15.9%) earned over $70,000 compared to 17.2% nationally. The employment status of those at least 15 was that 36 (27.3%) people were employed full-time, 24 (18.2%) were part-time, and 6 (4.5%) were unemployed.

References

Wises New Zealand Guide, 7th Edition, 1979. p. 508.

External links

 Photographs of Whangaroa held in Auckland Libraries' heritage collections.

Far North District
Populated places in the Northland Region
Whaingaroa
Kauri gum